The Declaration Form for Holders of the Macau SAR Permanent Resident Identity Card to Hong Kong SAR is a form available free of charge that must be completed by holders of a Macau Special Administrative Region Resident Identity Card (for permanent residents) who wish to enter the Hong Kong Special Administrative Region on a visit lasting no longer than 180 days for pleasure, business or transit. It is completed in place of the Arrivals Card filled in by other non-residents upon arrival in Hong Kong (which Macau residents entering on a Portuguese passport should complete instead).

This form can only be obtained on departure from Macau.  Therefore, if travelers want to enter Hong Kong from a third country or Mainland China not passing through Macau, they must ensure that they have obtained enough copies of the Declaration Form prior to their departure from Macau.

References

Macau Permanent Resident Identity Card, Hong Kong travel
Macau Permanent Resident Identity Card, Hong Kong travel
Macau Permanent Resident Identity Card, Hong Kong travel
Permanent Resident Identity Card, Hong Kong travel
Permanent Resident Identity Card, Hong Kong travel
Macau Permanent Resident Identity Card, Hong Kong travel